The Son-of-a-Gun is a 1919 American silent Western film directed by and starring Gilbert M. 'Broncho Billy' Anderson.

A surviving Anderson western preserved at the Library of Congress and also in versions on home video/DVD.

Cast 
 Gilbert M. 'Broncho Billy' Anderson as Bill
 Joy Lewis as May Brown
 Fred Church as Buck Saunders
 Frank Whitson as Double Deck Harry
 A.E. Wittin as W.L. 'Old Man' Brown
 Mattie Witting as Mother Brown
 Paul Willis as Buddy Brown

References

External links 
 
 

1919 films
1919 Western (genre) films
American black-and-white films
Silent American Western (genre) films
1910s American films
1910s English-language films